The Progressive Broadcasting System (PBS) was a short-lived radio network of the early 1950s. "[C]atering to smaller radio stations," the company had hoped to affiliate with around 1,000 radio stations in the United States which did not already have affiliation agreements with the "Big Four" national radio networks of those days: NBC, CBS, ABC, and Mutual, as well as LBS, second in size to Mutual.
 
Time announced the company's formation on September 4, 1950. Broadcasts began November 26, 1950.

Operation
Progressive planned to offer programming for 10 hours of the day on as many as 350 radio stations. At a press conference August 10, 1950, Progressive President Larry Finley told reporters, "Advertising will be local, except for the night programs, and there will be no network option time." The network's flagship station was KGFJ in Hollywood.

Two hundred stations were needed for the network to break even. However, only "about 100 stations" joined, and the network folded at the end of its schedule on January 31, 1951.

Organization
After "nearly two years of planning and organization," PBS had capitalization of $1,500,000 and was incorporated in California.

Executives of the network included Miller McClintock, chairman and chief executive; Larry Finley, president; Donald Withycomb, executive vice president; Edgar H. Twalmley, vice president in charge of the eastern division; Robert B. White, vice president in charge of the central division; B.B. Robinson, vice president in charge of finance; Kolin Hagar, eastern district manager; and Nat Linden, chief of production.

Programming
Billing its offerings as "The world's greatest daytime network radio programming," PBS made programming ("aimed primarily at the housewife") available to affiliates from 7 a.m. to 7 p.m. daily. Programs offered were much like those of other networks, "including an array of soap operas, quiz shows, children's features, variety shows and audience participation programs."

Public service
On December 15, 1950, President Harry S. Truman proclaimed "the existence of a state of national emergency." Afterward, PBS officials sent a letter to approximately 60 agencies and departments of the federal government saying that "its program lines [would be] kept open until 11 p.m. and offering those evening hours to the government for any messages or programs which PBS can take to its member stations in support of defense and emergency activities."

Initial program lineup
The following is the lineup of programs with which PBS launched its operation.

References

Defunct radio networks in the United States
Radio stations established in 1950
Radio stations disestablished in 1951

Defunct radio stations in the United States